In calculus, the chain rule is a formula that expresses the derivative of the composition of two differentiable functions  and  in terms of the derivatives of  and . More precisely, if  is the function such that  for every , then the chain rule is, in Lagrange's notation,

or, equivalently,

The chain rule may also be expressed in Leibniz's notation. In this case, the chain rule is expressed as
 
and

for indicating at which points the derivatives have to be evaluated.

In integration, the counterpart to the chain rule is the substitution rule.

Intuitive explanation

As put by George F. Simmons: "if a car travels twice as fast as a bicycle and the bicycle is four times as fast as a walking man, then the car travels 2 × 4 = 8 times as fast as the man." 

The relationship between this example and the chain rule is as follows. Let ,   and  be the (variable) positions of the car, the bicycle, and the walking man, respectively. The rate of change of relative positions of the car and the bicycle is  Similarly,  So, the rate of change of the relative positions of the car and the walking man is

The rate of change of positions is the ratio of the speeds, and the speed is the derivative of the position with respect to the time; that is,

or, equivalently,

which is also an application of the chain rule.

History 

The chain rule seems to have first been used by Gottfried Wilhelm Leibniz. He first mentioned it in a 1676 memoir (with a sign error in the calculation). The common notation of the chain rule is due to Leibniz. Guillaume de l'Hôpital used the chain rule implicitly in his Analyse des infiniment petits. The chain rule does not appear in any of Leonhard Euler's analysis books, even though they were written over a hundred years after Leibniz's discovery.. It is believed that the first "modern" version of the chain rule appears in Lagrange’s 1797 Théorie des fonctions analytiques; it also appears in Cauchy’s 1823 Résumé des Leçons données a L’École Royale Polytechnique sur Le Calcul Infinitesimal.

Statement 

The simplest form of the chain rule is for real-valued functions of one real variable.

The rule is sometimes abbreviated as

The points where the derivatives are evaluated may also be stated explicitly:

Carrying the same reasoning further, given  functions  with the composite function , if each function  is differentiable at its immediate input, then the composite function is also differentiable by the repeated application of Chain Rule, where the derivative is (in Leibniz's notation):

Applications

Composites of more than two functions 
The chain rule can be applied to composites of more than two functions. The derivative of  can be calculated directly, and the derivative of  can be calculated by applying the chain rule again.

For concreteness, consider the function

This can be decomposed as the composite of three functions:

Their derivatives are:

The chain rule states that the derivative of their composite at the point  is:

 

In Leibniz's notation, this is:

or for short,

The derivative function is therefore:

Applying the chain rule in this manner would yield:

This is the same as what was computed above. This should be expected because .

Sometimes, it is necessary to differentiate an arbitrarily long composition of the form . In this case, define

where  and  when . Then the chain rule takes the form

or, in the Lagrange notation,

Quotient rule 

The chain rule can be used to derive some well-known differentiation rules. For example, the quotient rule is a consequence of the chain rule and the product rule. To see this, write the function  as the product .  First apply the product rule:

By applying the chain rule, the last expression becomes:

which is the usual formula for the quotient rule.

Derivatives of inverse functions 

Suppose that  has an inverse function. Call its inverse function  so that we have . To see this, note that  and  satisfy the formula

Therefore, we have that:

To express  as a function of an independent variable , we substitute  for  wherever it appears.

For example, consider the function .  It has an inverse .  Because , the above formula says that

This formula is true whenever  is differentiable and its inverse  is also differentiable. This formula can fail when one of these conditions is not true. For example, consider . Therefore, the formula fails in this case. This is not surprising because  is not differentiable at zero.

Higher derivatives 
Faà di Bruno's formula generalizes the chain rule to higher derivatives.

Proofs

First proof 

Assume for the moment that  does not equal  for any  near .  Then the previous expression is equal to the product of two factors:

Whenever this happens, the above expression is undefined because it involves division by zero. To work around this, introduce a function  as follows:

To do this, recall that the limit of a product exists if the limits of its factors exist. When this happens, the limit of the product of these two factors will equal the product of the limits of the factors.

Second proof 
Another way of proving the chain rule is to measure the error in the linear approximation determined by the derivative.  This proof has the advantage that it generalizes to several variables.  It relies on the following equivalent definition of differentiability at a point: A function g is differentiable at a if there exists a real number g′(a) and a function ε(h) that tends to zero as h tends to zero, and furthermore

In the situation of the chain rule, such a function ε exists because g is assumed to be differentiable at a.  Again by assumption, a similar function also exists for f at g(a).  Calling this function η, we have

The above definition imposes no constraints on η(0), even though it is assumed that η(k) tends to zero as k tends to zero.  If we set , then η is continuous at 0.

Proving the theorem requires studying the difference  as h tends to zero.  The first step is to substitute for  using the definition of differentiability of g at a:

The next step is to use the definition of differentiability of f at g(a).  This requires a term of the form  for some k.  In the above equation, the correct k varies with h.  Set  and the right hand side becomes .  Applying the definition of the derivative gives:

To study the behavior of this expression as h tends to zero, expand kh. After regrouping the terms, the right-hand side becomes:

Because ε(h) and η(kh) tend to zero as h tends to zero, the first two bracketed terms tend to zero as h tends to zero.  Applying the same theorem on products of limits as in the first proof, the third bracketed term also tends zero.  Because the above expression is equal to the difference , by the definition of the derivative  is differentiable at a and its derivative is 

The role of Q in the first proof is played by η in this proof.  They are related by the equation:

The need to define Q at g(a) is analogous to the need to define η at zero.

Third proof 
Constantin Carathéodory's alternative definition of the differentiability of a function can be used to give an elegant proof of the chain rule.

There is at most one such function, and if  is differentiable at  then .

and

Therefore,

A similar approach works for continuously differentiable (vector-)functions of many variables. This method of factoring also allows a unified approach to stronger forms of differentiability, when the derivative is required to be Lipschitz continuous, Hölder continuous, etc. Differentiation itself can be viewed as the polynomial remainder theorem (the little Bézout theorem, or factor theorem), generalized to an appropriate class of functions.

Proof via infinitesimals 

If  and  then choosing infinitesimal  we compute the corresponding  and then the corresponding , so that

and applying the standard part we obtain

which is the chain rule.

Multivariable case 
The generalization of the chain rule to multi-variable functions is rather technical. However, it is simpler to write in the case of functions of the form 

As this case occurs often in the study of functions of a single variable, it is worth describing it separately.

Case of 

For writing the chain rule for a function of the form 
,
The usual notations for partial derivatives involve names for the arguments of the function. As these arguments are not named in the above formula, it is simpler and clearer to denote by 
 
 

With this notation, the chain rule is

Example: arithmetic operations
If the function  is addition, that is, if 

Thus, the chain rule gives 

For multiplication

Thus, 

The case of exponentiation

is slightly more complicated, as 

and, as 

It follows that

General rule
The simplest way for writing the chain rule in the general case is to use the total derivative, which is a linear transformation that captures all directional derivatives in a single formula.

or for short,

The higher-dimensional chain rule can be proved using a technique similar to the second proof given above.

Because the total derivative is a linear transformation, the functions appearing in the formula can be rewritten as matrices.  The matrix corresponding to a total derivative is called a Jacobian matrix, and the composite of two derivatives corresponds to the product of their Jacobian matrices.  From this perspective the chain rule therefore says:

or for short,

That is, the Jacobian of a composite function is the product of the Jacobians of the composed functions (evaluated at the appropriate points).

The higher-dimensional chain rule is a generalization of the one-dimensional chain rule. Specifically, they are:

In the language of linear transformations, Da(g) is the function which scales a vector by a factor of g′(a) and Dg(a)(f) is the function which scales a vector by a factor of f′(g(a)). The chain rule says that the composite of these two linear transformations is the linear transformation , and therefore it is the function that scales a vector by f′(g(a))⋅g′(a).

In this case, the above rule for Jacobian matrices is usually written as:

The chain rule for total derivatives implies a chain rule for partial derivatives.  Recall that when the total derivative exists, the partial derivative in the ith coordinate direction is found by multiplying the Jacobian matrix by the ith basis vector.  By doing this to the formula above, we find:

Since the entries of the Jacobian matrix are partial derivatives, we may simplify the above formula to get:

More conceptually, this rule expresses the fact that a change in the xi direction may change all of g1 through gm, and any of these changes may affect f.

In the special case where , so that f is a real-valued function, then this formula simplifies even further:

This can be rewritten as a dot product.  Recalling that , the partial derivative  is also a vector, and the chain rule says that:

Example 

and

Higher derivatives of multivariable functions 

Faà di Bruno's formula for higher-order derivatives of single-variable functions generalizes to the multivariable case.

Further generalizations 
All extensions of calculus have a chain rule. In most of these, the formula remains the same, though the meaning of that formula may be vastly different.

One generalization is to manifolds. This theorem is an immediate consequence of the higher dimensional chain rule given above, and it has exactly the same formula.

The chain rule is also valid for Fréchet derivatives in Banach spaces. The same formula holds as before. This case and the previous one admit a simultaneous generalization to Banach manifolds.

In differential algebra, the derivative is interpreted as a morphism of modules of Kähler differentials. A ring homomorphism of commutative rings  determines a morphism of Kähler differentials  which sends an element dr to d(f(r)), the exterior differential of f(r). The formula  holds in this context as well.

The common feature of these examples is that they are expressions of the idea that the derivative is part of a functor. A functor is an operation on spaces and functions between them. It associates to each space a new space and to each function between two spaces a new function between the corresponding new spaces. In each of the above cases, the functor sends each space to its tangent bundle and it sends each function to its derivative. For example, in the manifold case, the derivative sends a Cr-manifold to a Cr−1-manifold (its tangent bundle) and a Cr-function to its total derivative. There is one requirement for this to be a functor, namely that the derivative of a composite must be the composite of the derivatives.  This is exactly the formula .

There are also chain rules in stochastic calculus. One of these, Itō's lemma, expresses the composite of an Itō process (or more generally a semimartingale) dXt with a twice-differentiable function f.  In Itō's lemma, the derivative of the composite function depends not only on dXt and the derivative of f but also on the second derivative of f. The dependence on the second derivative is a consequence of the non-zero quadratic variation of the stochastic process, which broadly speaking means that the process can move up and down in a very rough way. This variant of the chain rule is not an example of a functor because the two functions being composed are of different types.

See also

  − a computational method that makes heavy use of the chain rule to compute exact numerical derivatives.

References

External links
 
 

Articles containing proofs
Differentiation rules
Theorems in analysis
Theorems in calculus